Estonian Volleyball Federation (abbreviation EVF) is one of the sport governing bodies in Estonia which deals with volleyball.

EVF is established on 14 December 1923 as Estonian Handball Union. During Soviet Estonia period, there existed Estonian SSR Volleyball Federation. EVF was re-established on 1 June 1990. EVF is a member of International Volleyball Federation (FIVB).

References

External links
 

Sports governing bodies in Estonia
Volleyball in Estonia
National members of the European Volleyball Confederation
Sports organizations established in 1923